

Exhibitions

Solo exhibitions

2020 
 Smile!, Nicola Erni Collection, Steinhausen, Switzerland

2019 
 Mario Testino: East, Hamiltons Gallery, London 
Superstar, Erarta Museum of Contemporary Art, Saint Petersburg, Russia

2017 
 Undressed, Helmut Newton Foundation, Berlin, Germany

2016 
 No Limits, Kunstforeningen GL STRAND, Copenhagen, Denmark

2015 
 In Your Face, Kunstbibliothek / Kulturforum, Staatliche Museen zu Berlin, Berlin, Germany

2014 
 Alta Moda, Dallas Contemporary, Dallas, US
 In Your Face, Fundação Armando Alvares, Penteado (FAAP), São Paulo, Brazil
 Extremes, Yvon Lambert Gallery, Paris, France
 In Your Face, MALBA, Buenos Aires, Argentina

2013 
 Alta Moda, Queen Sofía Spanish Institute, New York, US
 Private View, Seoul Arts Center, Seoul, South Korea
 Alta Moda, Mate – Museo Mario Testino, Lima, Peru
 Mario Testino, Prism, Los Angeles, US

2012 
 Private View, Shanghai Art Museum, Shanghai, China
 British Royal Portraits, Museum of Fine Arts, Boston, US
 In Your Face, Museum of Fine Arts, Boston, US
 British Royal Portraits, National Portrait Gallery, London, UK
 Todo o Nada, Mate – Museo Mario Testino, Lima, Peru
 Private View, Today Art Museum, Beijing, China
 Moss Testino, The Finstock Gallery, London

2011 
 Todo o Nada, Fondazione Memmo – Palazzo Ruspoli, Rome, Italy

2010 
 Todo o Nada, Museo Thyssen-Bornemisza, Madrid, Spain
 Kate Who?, Phillips de Pury & Company, London, UK
 Portraits, Museo de Arte de Lima, Lima, Peru

2008 
 Obsessed by You, Phillips de Pury & Company, London, UK

2007 
 Out of Fashion, NRW Forum, Düsseldorf, Germany

2006 
 Out of Fashion, Phillips de Pury & Company, Paris, France
 Portraits, Museo San Ildefonso, Mexico City, Mexico
 Disciples, Galería Ramis Barquet, Monterrey, Mexico
 Out of Fashion, Phillips de Pury & Company, New York, US

2005 
 Diana, Princess of Wales by Mario Testino, Kensington Palace, London, UK

2004 
 Portraits, Tokyo Metropolitan Museum of Photography, Tokyo, Japan

2003 
 Disciples, Timothy Taylor Gallery, London, UK
 Portraits, National Galleries of Scotland, Edinburgh, UK

2002 
 Portraits, Foam Fotografiemuseum, Amsterdam, Netherlands
 Portraits, Museo Palazzo Reale, Milan, Italy
 Boys and Girls, Galleri Charlotte Lund, Stockholm, Sweden
 Portraits, National Portrait Gallery, London, UK

2000 
 Mario Testino, Galerie Vedovi, Brussels, Belgium

1999 
 Amsterdam, Timothy Taylor Gallery, London, UK
 Front Row / Backstage, Visionaire Gallery, New York, US

1998 
 Mario Testino, Mary Boone Gallery, New York, US
 Fashion Photographs, Fundação Armando Alvares Penteado (FAAP), São Paulo, Brazil
 A New Venture, Galleria Raucci/Santamaria, Naples, Italy

1997 
 Fashion Photographs 1993–1997 & Images for Gucci, Bunkamura Gallery, Tokyo, Japan

Art collection exhibitions

2014 
 Somos Libres II, Pinacoteca Giovanni e Marella Agnelli, Turin, Italy

2013 
 Somos Libres, MATE – Museo Mario Testino, Lima, Peru

Bibliography

Books and catalogues
 WOW, Superlabo, 2020
Ciao, Taschen, 2020
Pasito a Paso, MATE – Museo Mario Testino, 2019
Fina Estampa, MATE – Museo Mario Testino, 2018
Undressed Taschen, 2017
 Sir Taschen, 2015
 Alta Moda MATE (Museo Mario Testino), 2013
 In Your Face Taschen, 2012
 Private View Taschen, 2012
 Kate Moss by Mario Testino Taschen, 2011
 Kate Who? Phillips de Pury, 2010
 Todo o Nada, Museo Thyssen-Bornemisza, 2010
 MaRIO DE JANEIRO Testino Taschen, 2009
 Obsessed by You Phillips de Pury, 2008
 Let Me In! Taschen, 2007
 Out of Fashion Phillips de Pury, 2006
 Diana Princess of Wales by Mario Testino at Kensington Palace Taschen, 2005
 Kids Scriptum Editions, 2003
 Disciples Timothy Taylor Gallery, 2003
 Portraits Bulfinch Press, 2002
 Alive Bulfinch, 2001
 Front Row/Backstage Bulfinch, 1999
 Any Objections? Phaidon, 1998
 Fashion Photographs Fundação Armando Alvares Penteado (FAAP), 1998
 Fashion Photographs 1993-1997 & Images for Gucci Art Partner, 1997

Selected special projects and guest editorships

2014 

 Vogue Japan 15th Anniversary Special Edition (Obsession) by Mario Testino
 Welt am Sonntag Special Edition by Mario Testino
 German Vogue Special Edition (Blonde) by Mario Testino
 Somos Libres II, Rizzoli

2013 

 Vogue China 100th Issue Special Edition by Mario Testino
 Vogue Brasil Special Edition (Body) by Mario Testino
 Vogue Paris Special Edition (Peru) by Mario Testino

2012 

 Spanish Vogue Special Edition (Celebration) by Mario Testino

2011 

 Bruma, 20 Hoxton Square Projects, London, UK
 Vogue Brasil 36th Anniversary Special Edition by Mario Testino

2008 

 German Vogue Special Edition (Sex) by Mario Testino

2007 

 Mario Testino: At Home, Yvon Lambert Gallery, New York, US
 Lima Peru, Damiani

2006 

 Stern Portfolio, No. 53 (Mario Testino)

2005 

 New Photography Selected by Mario Testino, Photo London, Burlington Gardens, London, UK
 Visionaire, No. 46 (Uncensored)

2004 

 Instinctive: Latin American Artists Selected by Mario Testino, Andrea Rosen Gallery, New York, US

2001 

 Dutch, No. 34 by Mario Testino
 Visionaire, No. 35 (Man)
 Pirelli Calendar 2001

2000 

 Stern Portfolio, No. 20 (Mario Testino Party)

1998 

 A Coincidence of the Arts by Mario Testino and Martin Amis, Coromandel Express

1997 

 Dutch, No. 1 by Mario Testino
 Visionaire, No. 22 (Chic)

References

Testino, Mario